The Matan Women's Institute for Torah Studies (an abbreviation of , Machon torani l’nashim) is an Israeli Midrasha dedicated to teaching the Talmud and other rabbinic literature to women.

The Institute was established in 1988 by Malke Bina, who had studied at the Michlala Jerusalem College for Women and the Revel Graduate School of Yeshiva University. Its faculty includes Rachelle Sprecher Fraenkel and Avivah Gottlieb Zornberg.

Matan offers numerous classes, a year-long bet midrash program, as well as various certification programs. In 2012, Matan held a siyyum for fifteen women who had completed the Daf Yomi 7-year cycle of Talmud study, called by some the first of its kind.

References

External links 
 

Jewish seminaries
Modern Orthodox Judaism in Israel
Orthodox Jewish schools for women
Orthodox Judaism in Israel
Women rabbis and Torah scholars
1988 establishments in Israel